Aloe vera is a succulent plant species of the genus Aloe. It is widely distributed, and is considered an invasive species in many world regions.

An evergreen perennial, it originates from the Arabian Peninsula, but grows wild in tropical, semi-tropical, and arid climates around the world. It is cultivated for commercial products, mainly as a topical treatment used over centuries. The species is attractive for decorative purposes, and succeeds indoors as a potted plant.

It is used in many consumer products, including beverages, skin lotion, cosmetics, ointments or in the form of gel for minor burns and sunburns. There is little clinical evidence for the effectiveness or safety of Aloe vera extract as a cosmetic or topical drug, and oral ingestion has risk of toxicity.

Etymology  

The genus name Aloe is derived from the Arabic word alloeh, meaning "bitter and shiny substance" or from Hebrew  ahalim, plural of  ahal. The specific epithet vera comes from verus meaning "true" in Latin.

Common names 
Common names use aloe with a region of its distribution, such as Chinese aloe, Cape aloe or Barbados aloe.

Taxonomy 
The species has several synonyms: Aloe barbadensis Mill., Aloe indica Royle, Aloe perfoliata L. var. vera and Aloe vulgaris Lam. Some literature identifies the white-spotted form of Aloe vera as Aloe vera var. chinensis; and the spotted form of Aloe vera may be conspecific with A. massawana. The species was first described by Carl Linnaeus in 1753 as Aloe perfoliata var. vera, and was described again in 1768 by Nicolaas Laurens Burman as Aloe vera in Flora Indica on 6 April and by Philip Miller as Aloe barbadensis some ten days after Burman in the Gardener's Dictionary.

Techniques based on DNA comparison suggest Aloe vera is relatively closely related to Aloe perryi, a species endemic to Yemen. Similar techniques, using chloroplast DNA sequence comparison and ISSR profiling have also suggested it is closely related to Aloe forbesii, Aloe inermis, Aloe scobinifolia, Aloe sinkatana, and Aloe striata. With the exception of the South African species A. striata, these Aloe species are native to Socotra (Yemen), Somalia, and Sudan. The lack of obvious natural populations of the species has led some authors to suggest Aloe vera may be of hybrid origin.

Description 

Leaves 
The leaves are thick and fleshy, green to grey-green, with some varieties showing white flecks on their upper and lower stem surfaces. The margin of the leaf is serrated and has small white teeth.

Aloe vera leaves contain phytochemicals under study for possible bioactivity, such as lignans, phytosterols, polyphenols, acetylated mannans, polymannans, anthraquinone C-glycosides, anthrones, and other anthraquinones, such as emodin and various lectins.

Flowers 

Random House Australia '' </ref> Like other Aloe species, Aloe vera forms arbuscular mycorrhiza, a symbiosis that allows the plant better access to mineral nutrients in soil.

 Distribution A. vera is considered to be native only to the south-east Arabian Peninsula in the Al Hajar Mountains in north-eastern Oman. However, it has been widely cultivated around the world, and has become naturalized in North Africa, as well as Sudan and neighboring countries, along with the Canary Islands, Cape Verde, and Madeira Islands. It has also naturalized in the Algarve region of Portugal, and in wild areas across southern Spain, especially in the region of Murcia.

The species was introduced to China and various parts of southern Europe in the 17th century. It is widely naturalized elsewhere, occurring in arid, temperate, and tropical regions of temperate continents. The current distribution may be the result of cultivation."Aloe vera (Linnaeus) Burman f., Fl. Indica. 83. 1768." in Flora of North America Vol. 26, p. 411

 Cultivation Aloe vera has been widely grown as an ornamental plant. The species is popular with modern gardeners as a topical medicinal plant and for its interesting flowers, form, and succulence. This succulence enables the species to survive in areas of low natural rainfall, making it ideal for rockeries and other low water-use gardens. The species is hardy in zones 8–11, and is intolerant of heavy frost and snow. The species is relatively resistant to most insect pests, though spider mites, mealy bugs, scale insects, and aphid species may cause a decline in plant health. This plant has gained the Royal Horticultural Society's Award of Garden Merit.

In pots, the species requires well-drained, sandy potting soil, and bright, sunny conditions. Aloe plants can turn red from sunburn under too much direct sun, though gradual acclimation may help. The use of a good-quality commercial propagation mix or packaged "cacti and succulent mix" is recommended, as they allow good drainage. Terra cotta pots are preferable as they are porous. Potted plants should be allowed to completely dry before rewatering. When potted, aloes can become crowded with "pups" growing from the sides of the "mother plant". Plants that have become crowded can be divided and repotted to allow room for further growth, or the pups can be left with the mother plant. During winter, Aloe vera may become dormant, during which little moisture is required. In areas that receive frost or snow, the species is best kept indoors or in heated glasshouses.
Houseplants requiring similar care include haworthia and agave.

There is large-scale agricultural production of Aloe vera in Australia, Cuba, the Dominican Republic, China, Mexico, India, Jamaica, Kenya, Tanzania, South Africa, Spain, and the United States, with much of the output going toward the cosmetics industry.

Uses
Two substances from Aloe vera – a clear gel and its yellow latex – are used to manufacture commercial products. Aloe gel typically is used to make topical medications for skin conditions, such as burns, wounds, frostbite, rashes, psoriasis, cold sores, or dry skin. Aloe latex is used individually or manufactured as a product with other ingredients to be ingested for relief of constipation. Aloe latex may be obtained in a dried form called resin or as "aloe dried juice".

There is conflicting evidence regarding whether Aloe vera is effective as a treatment for wounds or burns. There is some evidence that topical use of aloe products might relieve symptoms of certain skin disorders, such as psoriasis, acne, or rashes, but topical application may cause an allergic reaction in some people.Aloe vera gel is used commercially as an ingredient in yogurts, beverages, and some desserts, but at high or prolonged doses, ingesting aloe latex or whole leaf extract can be toxic. Use of topical aloe vera in small amounts is likely to be safe.

Topical medication and potential side effectsAloe vera may be prepared as a lotion, gel, soap or cosmetics product for use on skin as a topical medication. For people with allergies to Aloe vera, skin reactions may include contact dermatitis with mild redness and itching, difficulty with breathing, or swelling of the face, lips, tongue, or throat.

Dietary supplement
Aloin, a compound found in the semi-liquid latex of some Aloe species, was the common ingredient in over-the-counter (OTC) laxative products in the United States until 2002 when the Food and Drug Administration banned it because manufacturers failed to provide the necessary safety data. Aloe vera has potential toxicity, with side effects occurring at some dose levels both when ingested and when applied topically. Although toxicity may be less when aloin is removed by processing, Aloe vera ingested in high amounts may induce side effects, such as abdominal pain, diarrhea or hepatitis. Chronic ingestion of aloe (dose of 1 gram per day) may cause adverse effects, including hematuria, weight loss, and cardiac or kidney disorders.Aloe vera juice is marketed to support the health of the digestive system, but there is neither scientific evidence nor regulatory approval for this claim. The extracts and quantities typically used for such purposes are associated with toxicity in a dose-dependent way.

Traditional medicineAloe vera is used in traditional medicine as a skin treatment. Early records of its use appear from the fourth millennium BCE. It is also written of in the Juliana Anicia Codex of 512 CE.

CommoditiesAloe vera is used on facial tissues where it is promoted as a moisturizer and anti-irritant to reduce chafing of the nose. Cosmetic companies commonly add sap or other derivatives from Aloe vera'' to products such as makeup, tissues, moisturizers, soaps, sunscreens, incense, shaving cream, or shampoos. A review of academic literature notes that its inclusion in many hygiene products is due to its "moisturizing emollient effect".

Toxicity

Orally ingested non-decolorized aloe vera leaf extract was listed by the California Office of Environmental Health Hazard Assessment among "chemicals known to the state to cause cancer or reproductive toxicity", possibly resulting from the anthraquinones.

Use of aloe vera on the skin is generally not associated with significant side effects. Oral ingestion of aloe vera is potentially toxic, and may cause abdominal cramps and diarrhea which in turn can decrease the absorption of drugs.

Interactions with prescribed drugs
Ingested aloe products may have adverse interactions with prescription drugs, such as those used to treat blood clots, diabetes, heart disease and potassium-lowering agents (such as Digoxin), and diuretics, among others.

Gallery

See also
 Medicinal plants
 Succulent plants

References

External links
 

vera
Drought-tolerant plants
Flora of the Arabian Peninsula
Garden plants of Africa